Isabel Rey (born 22 March 1966 in Valencia) is a Spanish operatic soprano who has performed leading roles in the opera houses of Europe and appears on many recordings.

Discography 
Handel: Semele – Conductor: William Christie; Rey, Bartoli, Workman (DECCA 2009)
Donizetti: Don Pasquale – Conductor: Nello Santi; Rey, Flórez, Raimondi (DECCA 2009)
Mozart: La finta giardiniera – Conductor: Nikolaus Harnoncourt; Mei, Rey, Schaschina (TKD 2008)
Boccherini: Stabat Mater – Conductor: Frizza; Rey, Barcellona (DECCA 2007)
Debussy: Pelléas et Mélisande – Conductor: Welser-Möst; Rey, Gilfry, Volle, Kalish (TKD 2006)
Purcell: King Arthur – Conductor: Harnoncourt, Isabel Rey, Bonney, Remmert, (Salzburg Festival 2005)
Manuel Fernández Caballero: El dúo de la africana – Conductor: López Cobos; Rey, Rodríguez, Orozco, (Deutsche Grammophon 2004).
Mozart: Le nozze di Figaro – Conductor: Harnoncourt; Gilfry, Mei, Rey, Chausson (TKD 2009).
Varios: Arias y dúos de ópera – Conductor: Bragado; Rey, Gavanelli (RTVE).
Monteverdi: Il ritorno d'Ulisse in Patria – Conductor: Harnoncourt; Rey, Kasarova, Henschel (ARTHAUS 2002).
Mozart: Don Giovanni – Conductor: Harnoncourt, Rey, Gilfry, Polgar, Bartoli (ARTHAUS 2001).
Various: Las Damas del Canto – Rey, De los Ángeles, Berganza, Scotto, Caballé, Bayo, Arteta (RTVE Música 2001).
César Cano: Te Deum – Conductor: Galduf; Rey, Mentxaca, Cid (Petagas S.A. 2001).
Various: Canciones para la navidad – Piano: Zabala; Isabel Rey (Discmedi 1999).
Various: Natsu no Omoide – Guitar: Suzuki; Isabel Rey (Discmedi 1999)
Mozart: Le nozze di Figaro – Conductor: Harnoncourt; Rey, Hampson, Margiono, Bonney (Teldec 1994)
Various: The Passion of Spain – Rey, Carreras (Teldec 1993)
Various: Opera Gala – Rey, Caballé, De los Ángeles, Carreras, González, Pons (RTVE 1992).

Sources
Cummings, David (ed.), "Rey, Isabel", International Who's Who in Classical Music, Routledge, 2003, p. 654. 
Llorente, J. Antonio, "Isabel Rey, soprano: «Voy a ser una tía estupenda para el resto de mis dias»" (in Spanish), ABC, 24 August 2004
Rus, César, "El talento de Isabel Rey" (in Spanish), Las Provincias, 25 June 2006

External links 
 
  archived on 2016-10-11
 

Living people
1966 births
Spanish operatic sopranos
Singers from the Valencian Community
People from Valencia
21st-century Spanish women opera singers
20th-century Spanish women opera singers